The 2023 World Snooker Championship (officially the 2023 Cazoo World Snooker Championship) is an upcoming professional snooker tournament that will be held from 15 April to 1 May 2023 at the Crucible Theatre in Sheffield, England, the 47th consecutive year that the World Snooker Championship will be staged at the venue. Organised by the World Snooker Tour, it will be the 15th and final ranking tournament of the 2022–23 snooker season. It will be sponsored for the first time by British car retailer Cazoo, which is sponsoring all three Triple Crown tournaments during the season. It will be broadcast in the UK by the BBC, which extended a deal to broadcast the three Triple Crown events until 2027.

Ronnie O'Sullivan will be the defending champion, having won his seventh world title at the 2022 event, where he defeated Judd Trump 18–13 in the final.

Background

The year 2023 will be the 47th consecutive year that the tournament is held at the Crucible, and the 55th successive year that the World Championship is contested through the modern knockout format. Stephen Hendry and Ronnie O'Sullivan have been the most successful participants at the World Championship in the modern era, both players having won the title seven times each. O'Sullivan will be the defending champion, having defeated 2019 champion Judd Trump 18–13 in the 2022 final.

Format
The 2023 World Snooker Championship will take place from 15 April to 1 May 2023, as the last ranking event in the 2022–23 season. It will be preceded by a qualifying tournament held in April 2023. World Snooker Championship qualifying tournaments from 2020 to 2022 had featured three rounds played as the best of 11 frames and a final round played as the best of 19 frames. However, the World Snooker Tour announced that all qualifying rounds from 2023 onwards would revert to the best-of-19 format used prior to the COVID-19 pandemic, but with the seeded draws remaining in place.

References

External links
 

2023
2023 in English sport
World Championship
2020s in Sheffield
April 2023 sports events in the United Kingdom
May 2023 sports events in the United Kingdom
Snooker
Sports competitions in Sheffield